In genetics, rs1800532 (A218C) is a genetic variant.
It is a single nucleotide polymorphism in the TPH1 gene and located in intron 7.

It has been examined in relation to personality traits.

A779C is another SNP in same intron.

References

SNPs on chromosome 11